Mestaruussarja (Championship series) was the top division of Finnish football from 1930 to 1989. It was replaced by Veikkausliiga in 1990.

In 1930 league format was used for the first time to decide the Finnish champion. Before that from 1908 to 1929 the championship was decided with cup competition. The league was dominated by clubs from Helsinki, Turku and Vyborg. The first champion was HIFK Fotboll from Helsinki. In 1935 four best clubs were from Helsinki and in 1934 and 1936 top three clubs also came from Helsinki. From 1908 to 1940 the championship went outside Helsinki on only six occasions. Kuopio was the first inland city to get into the league when Pallotoverit were promoted in 1938. During World War II years the league was sometimes cut short, abandoned or decided with cup competition instead. In 1940s TUL clubs also participated.

The last Mestaruussarja season was 1989 and FC Kuusysi was crowned as the last champions. The new top level division was at first called SM-liiga and later renamed as Veikkausliiga.

Mestaruussarja consisted of 8 clubs when it was founded. It was later expanded to ten and at the time of dissolution league had 12 clubs. The league's popularity peaked in 1960s. Ten HJK matches between 1964 and 1969 had more than 10,000 spectators. The highest attendance was 17,293 between HJK and FC Haka in 1965. Highest average attendance was 3,071 in 1967, a figure that is yet to be beaten by current Veikkausliiga.

Champions

Top scorers

External links 
 Finland - List of League First Level Tables at RSSSF

 
1
Fin